William D. "By" Dunham (May 2, 1910 – April 12, 2001) was an American songwriter and film producer.

Born William Donaldson Dunham in New York City, Dunham wrote songs for the films of many major stars, including John Wayne ("McLintock!"), Randolph Scott ("Seven Men From Now"), and three Bob Hope films: Boy, Did I Get a Wrong Number!, I'll Take Sweden, and Alias Jesse James. He also wrote the lyrics to the theme song for the Flipper television series, and for the film,  The New Adventures of Flipper. His other films included The Young Swingers, Surf Party and Wild on the Beach,
the last of which he also produced.

Dunham died in Encinitas, California.

External links

American film producers
Songwriters from New York (state)
1910 births
2001 deaths
20th-century American musicians